In French, entrecôte is a premium cut of beef used for steaks and roasts.
A traditional entrecôte is a boneless cut from the rib area corresponding to the steaks known in different parts of the English-speaking world as rib, rib eye, Scotch fillet, club, or Delmonico.

The muscle group concerned is the longissimus dorsi, which runs down the back of the animal adjacent to the vertebrae and above the rib cage, and continues into the hind quarter. Once past the rib cage into the area adjacent to the lumbar vertebrae, this muscle group is no longer called an "entrecôte"—at that point it becomes a sirloin/strip steak (UK/N.Am, respectively), or a contre-filet in French.

Images

See also

 Cuts of beef by nation
 Entrecôte Café de Paris

References

Cuts of beef
French words and phrases